Utopia is a 1982 strategy video game by Don Daglow released for the Intellivision and Mattel Aquarius. It is often regarded as among the first city building games, and credited as "arguably the earliest ancestor of the real-time strategy genre." In July 2010, the game was re-released on Microsoft's Game Room service for its Xbox 360 console and for Games for Windows Live.

Gameplay

Utopia is a two-player game in which the two players each control one of the game's two islands. It lacks an AI opponent, although a single player can play to achieve a high score and ignore the other island. When starting the game, the players may choose how many rounds to play (up to 50) and the length of each round (30 to 120 seconds). The winner is the player with the most points at the end of the game.

Each player rules their own island and uses the controller disc to move a rectangular cursor around the screen. Both players spend gold bars to construct different buildings (houses, schools, factories, hospitals and forts), plant crops, build fishing boats or PT boats, or to fund rebel activity on the enemy island. As each island's population grows, the ruler is responsible for housing their people, feeding their populace and keeping them happy, or else risk rebel activity, which decreases the player's score and sometimes destroys buildings. Income is generated when randomly generated rain clouds, (and sometimes hurricanes) pass over a player's farms, when a fishing boat is positioned over a school of fish, and at the end of each round, based on the player's factory output and fishing boats.

Most rounds consist of constructing a building, then continuously maneuvering the player's fishing boat over a moving school of fish in order to maintain fishing income, with occasional interruptions to construct new buildings whenever the player is able to afford them. Alternatively, a player might spend resources and time maneuvering a PT boat to try and sink their opponent's fishing boat in order to keep their income down. Game algorithms generate and determine the course of rain clouds, tropical storms, hurricanes, schools of fish, and pirate ships.

Legacy
GameSpy included Utopia in its Hall of Fame in 2004, commenting: "Considering the state of home video-game technology in 1981, Utopia is an astonishingly detailed simulation." GameSpot featured Utopia in its series Unsung Heroes: Ground Breaking Games, calling it a "surprisingly complex game (often referred to as 'Civilization 0.5') [that] laid the foundation for PC sim classics such as Civilization and SimCity." In 2012, Utopia has been included in the Smithsonian Institution's "The Art of Video Games" exhibition.

Ars Technica cites Utopia as being the "birth of a genre", that "prior to the mid-1990s strategy games were turn based", the "idea of adding a real-time element to force players into instant, impulsive decisions was virtually unheard of."  Ars Technica states that it is "arguably the earliest ancestor of the real-time strategy genre". Matt Barton and Bill Loguidice say it "helped set the template for the real-time strategy genre", but has "more in common with SimCity than it does with Dune II and later RTS games." Brett Weiss argues that "[m]ost experts consider Utopia" to be "the first real-time strategy game."

A remake of the game has been announced for release exclusively for the Intellivision Amico.

Reviews
Games

References

External links
Utopia at MobyGames

1982 video games
City-building games
God games
Intellivision games
Mattel video games
Real-time strategy video games
Video games developed in the United States
Video games set on fictional islands